Brigadier Francis Chemonges, is a Ugandan military officer. He currently serves as the commandant of Kalama Armoured Warfare Training School (KAWATS), located in Kabamba, Mubende District, Central Uganda. Immediately prior to his appointment to his current post, in May 2013, he served as the operations officer of the Armoured Brigade, located in Masaka, Masaka District, Central Uganda. In 2010, at the rank of lieutenant colonel, Francis Chemonges was a commander of a battle group in AMISOM, based in Mogadishu, Somalia.

See also
 Katumba Wamala
 David Muhoozi
 Uganda People's Defence Force

References

External links
 Army Promotions: Museveni Sued

Living people
People from Kapchorwa District
Ugandan military personnel
Year of birth missing (living people)